Anfu Subdistrict is a subdistrict and the county seat of Linli County in Changde, Hunan, China. The subdistrict was incorporated from a part of the former Anfu Town in 2017. The subdistrict has 20 communities under its jurisdiction, its seat is Anfulu Community.

Subdivisions

References

Linli County
County seats in Hunan